The Little Boss is a 1919 American silent romantic comedy film directed by David Smith and produced by Vitagraph Studios. The story and screenplay were by Rida Johnson Young, and it starred Bessie Love and Wallace MacDonald.

The film is presumed lost.

Production 

Exterior scenes were filmed at the Little River Redwood Company, an actual lumber camp in Eureka, California. Scenes with log flumes were filmed in Fresno, California.

Plot 
Peggy (Love) is the owner of a lumber camp, and she falls for Clayton, a man from the city (MacDonald), who comes to the camp. Clayton's sister invites Peggy to come to the city, where she attends school, and becomes a "modern woman." When Peggy returns to the camp, it is revealed that she was never the true owner of the lumber camp, but this does not matter to Clayton, who is love with Peggy.

Cast 
 Bessie Love as Peggy, The Little Boss
 Wallace MacDonald as Clayton Hargis
 Otto Lederer as Sandy MacNab
 Harry Russell as Red O'Rourke
 J. Morley as Richard Leicester
 Joe Rickson as Pete Farley
 Clara Knight as Chloe
 Karl Formes as Old Farley

Release 
On its release, the film was shown with the a Burton Holmes Travelogue and the comedy Taking a Chance in some theaters; The Heart Punch and The Little Widow were shown in others.

Reception 
Clyde De Vinna's photography of the redwood forests was highly praised, although the overall reception of the film was negative.

References

External links 

 
 
 
 
 Lantern slide

1919 lost films
1919 romantic comedy films
American black-and-white films
American romantic comedy films
American silent feature films
Films directed by David Smith (director)
Films set in California
Lost American films
Lost romantic comedy films
1919 films
1910s American films
Silent romantic comedy films
Silent American comedy films
1910s English-language films